| tries = {{#expr:
 + 4 + 1 + 2 + 1 + 5 + 1
 + 1 + 1 + 2 + 3 + 0 + 5
 + 2 + 6 + 1 + 3 + 9 + 0
 + 0 + 1 + 3 + 5 + 0 + 4
 + 3 + 1 + 4 + 1 + 3 + 1
}}
| top point scorer =  Marcus Smith (71 points)
| top try scorer =  James Lowe Damian Penaud Gabin Villière (3 tries)
| Player of the tournament =  Antoine Dupont
| previous year = 2021
| previous tournament = 2021 Six Nations Championship
| next year = 2023
| next tournament = 2023 Six Nations Championship
}}
The 2022 Six Nations Championship (known as the Guinness Six Nations for sponsorship reasons) was the 23rd Six Nations Championship, the annual rugby union competition contested by the national teams of England, France, Ireland, Italy, Scotland, and Wales, and the 128th edition of the competition (including all its previous incarnations as the Home Nations Championship and Five Nations Championship). Wales entered the tournament as defending champions.

France won the Championship and the Grand Slam – both for the first time since 2010 – clinching the title with a 25–13 win over England at the Stade de France. Runners-up Ireland won the Triple Crown for the sixth time in the Six Nations era.

Italy came into the tournament on the back of 36 successive Six Nations losses since they beat Scotland, in 2015. Trailing 21–15 with less than two minutes remaining in their final game against Wales, Edoardo Padovani scored a try to win the match for Italy, ending a 40-match winless run in the Six Nations.

Participants

1 Owen Farrell was originally named in the England squad as captain ahead of the Championship, but was later ruled out due to injury. Tom Curry captained the team for the first two matches, and Courtney Lawes was captain for the final three rounds.
2 Fabien Galthié tested positive for COVID-19 ahead of the opening round and Raphaël Ibañez took on the role for France's match against Italy.
3 Johnny Sexton was ruled out in round 2 and James Ryan captained in his absence. Ryan was not selected in round 3 and Peter O'Mahony was named as captain.

Squads

Table

Table ranking rules
 Four points are awarded for a win.
 Two points are awarded for a draw.
 A bonus point is awarded to a team that scores four or more tries, or loses by seven points or fewer. If a team scores four or more tries, and loses by seven points or fewer, they are awarded both bonus points.
 Three bonus points are awarded to a team that wins all five of their matches (a Grand Slam). This ensures that a Grand Slam winning team would top the table with at least 23 points, as another team could lose one match while winning two bonus points and win the other four matches while winning four bonus points for a maximum of 22 points.
 Tiebreakers
 If two or more teams are tied on table points, the team with the better points difference (points scored less points conceded) is ranked higher.
 If the above tiebreaker fails to separate tied teams, the team that scores the higher number of total tries (including penalty tries) in their matches is ranked higher.
 If two or more teams remain tied after applying the above tiebreakers then those teams will be placed at equal rank; if the tournament has concluded and more than one team is placed first then the title will be shared between them.

Fixtures
The tournament's fixtures were announced on 28 April 2021, and included a Friday night game – Wales hosting France in round 4 – for the first time since the opening match of the 2019 Six Nations Championship.

Round 1

Notes:
 Seb Davies (Wales) was originally named on the bench but was replaced by Ben Carter prior to kick-off due to a back spasm.
 Mack Hansen (Ireland) and Dewi Lake (Wales) made their international debuts.
 Ross Moriarty (Wales) earned his 50th test cap.

Notes:
 Ben White (Scotland) made his international debut.
 Scotland achieved back-to-back wins against England for the first time since 1984.
 Scotland retained the Calcutta Cup.
 Tom Curry became England's youngest captain since Will Carling against Australia in 1988.

Notes:
 Toa Halafihi, Leonardo Marin, Tommaso Menoncello and Manuel Zuliani (all Italy) made their international debuts.
 Tommaso Menoncello (Italy) became the youngest player to score a try in any of the Six, Five or Home Nations Championships, surpassing Wales' Keith Jarrett in 1967.
 France retained the Giuseppe Garibaldi Trophy.

Round 2

Notes
 Wales retained the Doddie Weir Cup.
 Jac Morgan (Wales) and Rory Darge (Scotland) made their international debuts.
 Dan Biggar and Jonathan Davies (both Wales) won their 100th test caps, including caps for the British & Irish Lions.

Notes:
 Andrea Zambonin (Italy) and Ollie Chessum (England) made their international debuts.
 Ben Youngs made his 114th appearance for England, equalling Jason Leonard's record as England's most-capped player.
 England kept a clean sheet against Italy in the Six Nations for the first time.

Round 3

Notes:
 Hamish Watson (Scotland) was originally named to start, but was forced to withdraw the day before the match after testing positive for COVID-19. He was replaced by Nick Haining, whose place on the bench was taken by Andy Christie.
 Andy Christie (Scotland) made his international debut.
 France reclaimed the Auld Alliance Trophy, having lost it in 2020.

Notes:
 Manu Tuilagi (England) was originally named to start, but was forced to withdraw due to injury. His place in the starting line-up was taken by Elliot Daly, who was replaced on the bench by Joe Marchant.
 Ben Youngs made his 115th appearance for England to surpass Jason Leonard's record as England's most capped international player.
 Kyle Sinckler (England) and Alex Cuthbert (Wales) earned their 50th test caps.
 Courtney Lawes (England) and Dan Biggar (Wales) became the sixth club mates (Northampton Saints) in the history of the Championship to captain their countries against each other.

Notes:
 Michael Lowry (Ireland) made his international debut.
 Italy played with 13 players from the 19th minute of the match due to World Rugby Law 3.20, which requires a team that is unable to continue with contested scrums as a result of a player being sent off to lose an additional player. This meant that no replacement was made for Toa Halafihi.
 Italy suffered their 100th defeat in the Six Nations Championship.
 Referee Nika Amashukeli became the first Georgian and Tier 2 union official to referee in this Six Nations Championship.

Round 4

Notes:
 Ben Vellacott (Scotland) and Ange Capuozzo (Italy) made their international debuts.
 Ali Price (Scotland) earned his 50th test cap.
 Giosuè Zilocchi and Manuel Zuliani (Italy) were originally named on the bench, but were later replaced by Tiziano Pasquali and Braam Steyn.
 Scotland won the inaugural Cuttitta Cup.

Notes
 Ireland retain the Millennium Trophy.
 This was Ireland's biggest win over England at Twickenham since 1964, surpassing the 13-point margin in 1964.
 Charlie Ewels' red card was the quickest to be given (at 82 seconds) in Championship history.

Round 5

Notes:
 Alun Wyn Jones (Wales) made his 150th appearance, the first player to achieve this.
 Dan Biggar (Wales) became the seventh Welshman to earn his 100th test cap.
 Braam Steyn (Italy) earned his 50th test cap.
 Tiziano Pasquali (Italy) had been named on the bench but withdrew ahead of the game and replaced by Filippo Alongi.
 Filippo Alongi (Italy) made his international debut.
 Italy won in the Six Nations Championship for the first time since their victory over Scotland in Edinburgh in 2015 (19–22), ending a 36–match losing streak in the Championship.
 Italy defeated Wales for the first time since 2007, and achieved their first away victory against Wales.
 Italy won against a Tier 1 nation for the first time since their victory over South Africa in 2016 (20–18).

Notes:
 Ireland won the Triple Crown for the first time since 2018, and the first time at home since 2004.
 Ireland retained the Centenary Quaich.

Notes:
 France won their first Grand Slam title for the first time since 2010, the last time they won the Championship.
 France ended a 12-year wait to reclaim the Championship, their longest ever period between titles since their first title in 1959.

Player statistics

Most points

Most tries

Broadcasting

In the United Kingdom, each game was broadcast live on a free-to-air terrestrial TV channel, either the BBC or ITV, as a result of a new deal covering the four years from 2022 to 2025. The BBC broadcast all Scotland and Wales home fixtures, with ITV airing all England, France, Ireland and Italy home fixtures. All of Wales' games were also broadcast on S4C in the Welsh language

In the Republic of Ireland, all games were shown free-to-air on either RTÉ or Virgin Media under the terms of the new TV rights share.

Notes

References

 
2022
2022 rugby union tournaments for national teams
2021–22 in European rugby union
2021–22 in Irish rugby union
2021–22 in English rugby union
2021–22 in Welsh rugby union
2021–22 in Scottish rugby union
2021–22 in French rugby union
2021–22 in Italian rugby union
February 2022 sports events in Europe
February 2022 sports events in the United Kingdom
March 2022 sports events in Europe
March 2022 sports events in the United Kingdom